Kean is an 1836 play by the French writer Alexandre Dumas. It is based on the life of the British stage actor Edmund Kean. It premiered at the Théâtre des Variétés with Frédérick Lemaître in the title role.

Adaptation
It has been adapted into films several times including
 Kean, a 1921 silent German film
 Kean, a 1924 silent French film
 Kean, a 1940 Italian film
 Kean, a 1956 Italian film

A 1961 stage musical Kean was also based on the work.

References

Bibliography
 Goble, Alan. The Complete Index to Literary Sources in Film. Walter de Gruyter, 1999.

1836 plays
French plays adapted into films
Plays by Alexandre Dumas
Plays set in London
Biographical plays about actors